Pro-Iranism may refer to:

Iranian nationalism, nationalism among the people of Iran and individuals whose national identity is Iranian
Pan-Iranism, ideology that advocates solidarity and reunification of Iranian peoples
Persophilia, appreciation or interest in Iranian culture, people or history
Allies of Iran support for the nation, government, or peoples of the state of Iran